is a Japanese composer, arranger and conductor.

Biography
Senju studied composition at the Tokyo National University of Fine Arts and Music and received his master's degree with honors. 
Between 1994 and 2003, he produced series of cover albums Utahime for Japanese singer Akina Nakamori with more than million sold copies overall.

Composition credits include Mama wa Shōgaku 4 Nensei, Mobile Suit Victory Gundam, Rampo, Strawberry on the Shortcake, Yomigaeri, Red Garden, Nada Sōsō, Fūrin Kazan, Fullmetal Alchemist: Brotherhood, Tales of Vesperia: The First Strike, the 2012 revival of Iron Chef, and anime version of Battery. Arrangement credits include Hikari. Performance credits include Handsome Boy, The Snow Queen (Yuki no Joou).
His brother is Hiroshi Senju, the Nihonga painter.

Works

Anime series 
 Mama wa Shōgaku 4 Nensei (1992, Nippon TV)
 Mobile Suit Victory Gundam (1993–1994, TV Asahi)
 The Silent Service (1995–1998, OVA)
 B'T X (1996, TBS Television)
 Tetsujin 28-go (2004, TV Tokyo)
 The Snow Queen (2005, NHK General TV)
 Red Garden (2006, TV Asahi)
 Fullmetal Alchemist: Brotherhood (2009–2010, MBS)
 Valvrave the Liberator (2013, MBS)
 Battery (2016, Fuji TV)

Film music 
 Ribbon RE-BORN (1988)
 226 (1989)
 Tsurumoku Dokushinryō (1991)
 Chibi Maruko-chan: My Favorite Song (1992)
 Tōhō Kenbunroku (The Travels of Marco Polo) (1992)
 Kokōkyōshi (1993)
 Ienakiko (1994)
 The Mystery of Rampo – International version (1995)
 Night Train to the Stars (1996)
 Time Leap (1997)
 Acorn House (1997)
 Begging for Love (1998)
 Gensomaden Saiyuki: Requiem (2001)
 Meshita no koibito (2002)
 Yomigaeri (2003)
 Kurasshu (2003)
 The Man Who Wipes the Mirror (Mirror no Fukuotoko) (2004)
 Tetsujin 28: The Movie (2005)
 Hinokio (2005)
 A Heartful of Love (2005)
 Nada Sōsō (2006)
 Elephant no Senaka（2007年）
 Run with the Wind (2009)
 Magic Tree House (2012)
 Reminiscence (2017)

Film music (animation) 
 Princess Arete (2000) – directed by Sunao Katabuchi
 Tales of Vesperia: The First Strike (2009) – directed by Kanta Kamei

Television dramas (selected) 
 Summer Snow (2000, TBS Television)
 Strawberry on the Shortcake (2001, TBS Television)
 Tetsujin 28-go (2004)
 Suna no Utsuwa (2004)
 Red Garden (2006–2007)
 Fūrin Kazan (NHK, 2007)
Gold (2010, Fuji TV)
 Japanese Americans (2010, TBS Television) – miniseries

Video games 
 Fighting Illusion: K-1 Grand Prix (1996, Daft Co.)
 Fullmetal Alchemist: Prince of the Dawn (2009, Square Enix)
 Fullmetal Alchemist: Daughter of the Dusk (2009, Square Enix)
 Triangle Strategy (2022, Square Enix-Artdink)

Compositions 
 Sonata for clarinet and piano (1985)
 歌曲 (Circus) (1986)
 春光 for shakuhachi, synthesizer and computer (1987)
 回帰の街f or violin and orchestra (1988)
 Eden for computer (1989)
 Into the Sea for vibraphone and computer (1990)
 Henri's Sky (1991)
 Aria for marimba (1992) – inspired from J. S. Bach
 彩霧  (Saimu) for violin and string orchestra (1994)
 De Jabu I–IV for solo marimba (1994)
 聖歌 (Chant) for violin and synthesizer (1997)
 Serenade for solo violin (1997)
 Violin Concerto: Return to the Forest (2000)
 四季  (Four Seasons) for violin and string orchestra (2004)
 Symphony No. 1 (2005)
 日本交響詩  (Japan Symphonic Poems) (2005)
 Breath and Rosary for Electone (2006)
 Breath and Rosary for orchestra (2006)
 隅田川 (Sumidagawa), opera (2007) – libretto: Takashi Matsumoto
 源氏物語 (The Tale of Genji), Psalm symphony (2008) – libretto: Takashi Matsumoto
 Manyoshu (2009) – libretto: Madoka Mayuzumi
 Andante (2013)
 Waterfall no Shiraito, opera (2014) – libretto: Madoka Mayuzumi

External links
Official website

Akira Senju on VGMdb

References

1960 births
20th-century conductors (music)
20th-century Japanese male musicians
21st-century conductors (music)
21st-century Japanese male musicians
Anime composers
Japanese composers
Japanese conductors (music)
Japanese film score composers
Japanese male composers
Japanese male conductors (music)
Japanese male film score composers
Japanese music arrangers
Japanese record producers
Living people
Omega Tribe (Japanese band) members
Tokyo University of the Arts alumni
Video game composers